Ras-related protein Rab-1B is a protein that in humans is encoded by the RAB1B gene.

Interactions
RAB1B has been shown to interact with GOLGA2.

References

Further reading